PHN is an acronym used for postherpetic neuralgia, a neuropathic pain.

PHN may also refer to:
 North Philadelphia station (Amtrak station code)
 Spanish National Water Plan (Plan Hidrológico Nacional); see Water supply and sanitation in Spain
 Phoenician language (ISO 639-2 and ISO 639-3 codes)
 p-Hydroxynorephedrine, an analog of norephedrine
 St. Clair County International Airport (IATA and FAA LID codes)
 Public Health Nurse